Giorgio Pietro Verano Alvarez (born November 18, 1976), better known as Gio Alvarez, is a Filipino actor in movies and television shows. He was an original member of Ang TV, a youth-oriented variety show in the Philippines.

Career
He played as young Michael de Mesa in Hihintayin Kita Sa Langit (1991), starring Richard Gomez and Dawn Zulueta. He played as Bob Cosme, the second son of Kevin Cosme played by Dolphy in Home Along Da Riles, showed in ABS-CBN from 1992-2003. In 2003, he appeared in TV series It Might Be You with John Lloyd Cruz and Bea Alonzo.

Alvarez appeared in afternoon drama series of GMA Network's Kung Mamahalin Mo Lang Ako (2005) with Camille Prats, Ehra Madrigal and Marian Rivera. He was included in the cast of Asian Treasures (2007) with Robin Padilla and Angel Locsin.

He played as husband of Manilyn Reynes in the Halloween episode "Kandila" of Maalaala Mo Kaya.

Filmography

Television

Film

Discography
Gio - only rap album recorded
"Ang Huling El Bimbo" - soundtrack in the film Labs Kita, Okey Ka Lang?

Awards
3rd Pista ng Pelikulang Pilipino Best Supporting Actor

References

External links

1976 births
Living people
People from Mandaluyong
Male actors from Metro Manila
Star Magic personalities
ABS-CBN personalities
GMA Network personalities